Jacob Hibshman (January 31, 1772May 19, 1852) was a member of the U.S. House of Representatives from Pennsylvania's 3rd congressional district.

Early life
Jacob Hibshman was born on a farm near Ephrata in the Province of Pennsylvania.  He attended the common schools and a private school in Harrisburg, Pennsylvania.  He engaged in agricultural pursuits, and served as associate judge of Lancaster County, Pennsylvania from 1810 to 1819.

Career
Hibshman was elected as a Republican to the Sixteenth Congress.  He was an unsuccessful candidate for reelection in 1820 to the Seventeenth Congress.

He was deputy surveyor of Lancaster County for twenty years.  He was a justice of the peace and chairman of the board of canal appraisers.  He served as major general of the Pennsylvania Militia for twelve years.  He organized the Northern Mutual Insurance Co., in 1844 and served as its first president.  He died at his residence near Ephrata on May 19, 1852.  Interment in the Hibshman Cemetery on the farm near Ephrata.

References

1772 births
1852 deaths
Politicians from Lancaster, Pennsylvania
People from Ephrata, Pennsylvania
Pennsylvania state court judges
American surveyors
Democratic-Republican Party members of the United States House of Representatives from Pennsylvania